Penicillium albocoremium is a fungus species in the genus Penicillium growing in Allium cepa.

Penicillium albocoremium produces barceloneic acid B and andrastin A.

References 

albocoremium
Fungi described in 2000